Amsterdam Pirates is a Dutch baseball and softball organization based in Amsterdam that plays in the Honkbal Hoofdklasse. It was founded as an expansion of the football club SV Rap on 17 February 1959 by Loek Loevendie. In the first years it was known as the RAP Pirates, but after a few years the club changed its name according to American tradition (first city name, then franchise name) and became the Amsterdam Pirates.

The Pirates play at the Pirates Playground on Sportpark Ookmeer in Osdorp, in the west of Amsterdam. This stadium was one of the hosts of the 2007 European Softball Championship.

The club celebrated a Dutch Championship in 1987 and 1990. The next few years it was at the lower end of the League, which is dominated by Neptunus from Rotterdam. In earlier years there was another team in Amsterdam, called Amstel Tijgers (Tigers) and football club AFC Ajax also played baseball, and has been champions a number of times. The club is the second largest baseball club of the Netherlands (after Almere).

For sponsorship reasons, the baseball team plays under the name L&D Amsterdam.

Roster

New hopes and championship
In 2007 it reached the playoffs of the Dutch Honkbal Hoofdklasse for the first time in 15 years. It almost reached the Holland Series, coming back in a best of five series, after being 2–0 down, in the end they lost.

2008 did saw their third championship (and their 2nd holland series championship). They reached the playoffs by being 3rd in the regular season, then beating Neptunus in the first round and defending champions Kinheim in the 2008 Holland Series. The Holland Series was a clean sweep, with the final game ending 12–0.

In 2011 they were champions again, beating Hoofddorp Pioneers. In 2019 Amsterdam Pirates won its fifth championship, beating Neptunus with 4–3 in the Holland Series after a 3-0 backlog.

References

External links
Official Page
KNBSB Dutch baseball and softball association

Sports clubs in Amsterdam
Baseball teams in the Netherlands
Softball teams in the Netherlands